Hicksville is a hamlet and census-designated place (CDP) within the Town of Oyster Bay in Nassau County, on Long Island, in New York. The population of the CDP was 41,547 at the 2010 census.

History
Valentine Hicks, son-in-law of abolitionist and Quaker preacher Elias Hicks, and eventual president of the Long Island Rail Road, bought land in the village in 1834 and turned it into a station stop on the LIRR in 1837. The station became a depot for produce, particularly cucumbers for a Heinz Company plant. After a blight destroyed the cucumber crops, the farmers grew potatoes. It turned into a bustling New York City suburb in the building boom following World War II. The hamlet was named for Valentine Hicks.

Failed incorporation attempt 
In 1953, Hicksville attempted to incorporate itself as the Incorporated Village of Hicksville. Many residents felt that by incorporating as a village, the community would be run more effectively than by the Town of Oyster Bay. A petition had been signed with 6,242 signatures from residents in favor of the plan.

However, these plans were unsuccessful, and Hicksville remains an unincorporated area of the Town of Oyster Bay to this day, as of 2022.

Geography

Climate 
The climate is borderline between hot-summer humid continental (Dfa) and humid subtropical (Cfa) and the local hardiness zone is 7a. Average monthly temperatures in the village centre range from 31.9 °F in January to 74.7 °F in July.

Economy

Metalab Equipment Company, a division of Norbute Corp, made laboratory furniture and cabinetry. Alsy Manufacturing manufactured electric lamps and lampshades from 1975 through 1991.

The Rubber Company of America (RUCO) built a manufacturing site in 1945. RUCO Polymer Corp. (Hooker Chemical Company) manufactured plastics, latex, and esters. Occidental Chemical Corporation (OCC) owned and operated this site from 1966 to 1982. The site was purchased by Sybron Corporation, then in 2000, the Bayer Corporation (Bayer MaterialScience) purchased the Hooker Ruco facility and in 2002 decided to close the facility. The facility was a freight customer of the Long Island Rail Road and New York and Atlantic Railway, served by a spur track off the Main Line next to the grade crossing at New South Road. The site was used for the production of polyester from 1982 until 2002. The LIRR removed the switch during track work sometime after the closure and demolition of the buildings on the property. The property remains fenced-off and vacant currently.

The presence of a major LIRR hub means that Hicksville developed as a major bedroom community of New York City. The LIRR has a team yard on West John Street, just east of Charlotte Avenue, served by the New York and Atlantic Railway, for off-line freight customers receiving or shipping cargo by rail to anywhere in the North American rail network.

Hicksville's North Broadway, positioned in the center of Nassau County, developed into a significant retail center. North Broadway was home to the Mid-Island Shopping Plaza (now known as Broadway Mall), a 156,000-square-foot Sears department store and auto center (which closed in 2018) and various other restaurants and retail stores.

Hicksville is home to a number of Indian restaurants on Long Island due to its large proportion of immigrants from India, Bangladesh, and Pakistan.

Businesses with headquarters in Hicksville 
Major businesses headquartered within Hicksville include:
 National Grid USA's KeySpan Energy division
 Sam Ash Music
 Sleepy's mattress retail company (until acquired by MattressFirm in 2017)
 ScholarChip school ID card company

Demographics

2010 census

As of the 2010 census, there were 41,547 people, 13,412 households, and 10,588 families living in the CDP. The population density was 6,109.9 per square mile (2,360.6/km2). There were 13,761 housing units at an average density of 2,023.7/sq mi (781.9/km2). The racial makeup of the CDP was 69.3% White, 61.6% Non Hispanic White, 2.2% African American, 0.3% Native American, 20.7% Asian, 4.8% from other races, and 2.7% from two or more races. Hispanic or Latino of any race were 14.5% of the population.

There were 13,412 households, of which 35.7% had children under the age of 18 living with them. 63.1% were married couples living together, 10.8% had a female householder with no husband present, and 21.3% were non-families. 34.0% of all households were made up of individuals, and 8.8% had someone living alone who was 65 years of age or older. The average household size was 3.09 and the average family size was 3.47.

The population was spread out, with 21.1% under the age of 18, 8.6% from 18 to 24, 25.3% from 25 to 44, 29.9% from 45 to 64, and 15.1% who were 65 years of age or older. The median age was 41.4 years.

The median income for a household in the CDP was $89,231, and the median income for a family was $99,980. Males had a median income of $52,112 versus $46,278 for females. The per capita income for the CDP was $50,283. About 2.4% of families and 3.7% of the population were below the poverty line, including 3.9% of those under age 18 and 4.3% of those age 65 or over.

A Little India has developed in Hicksville, centered around Route 107 and Broadway. Starting around 1990, the area began attracting Indian immigrants who have established an extensive community including Indian restaurants, stores such as Patel Brothers,and other businesses, as well as Hindu temples and cultural events such as parades and Diwali festivals. The Indian population was estimated to be around 5,000 in 2013.

2000 census 
Per the 2000 U.S. Census, there were 41,261 people, 13,710 households, and 10,844 families living in the CDP. The population density was 6,057.2 per square mile (2,339.3/km2). There were 13,912 housing units at an average density of 2,042.4/sq mi (788.8/km2). The racial makeup of the CDP was 84.56% White, 1.36% African American, 0.11% Native American, 9.04% Asian, 0.03% Pacific Islander, 3.05% from other races, and 1.84% from two or more races. Hispanic or Latino of any race were 9.26% of the population.

The median income for a household in the CDP was $82,231, and the median income for a family was $94,910. Males had a median income of $52,112 versus $46,278 for females. The per capita income for the CDP was $50,283. About 2.4% of families and 3.7% of the population were below the poverty line, including 3.9% of those under age 18 and 4.3% of those age 65 or over.

South Asian population 
By 1996 there were around four to five restaurants in Hicksville serving South Asian cuisine, and this started the ascent of a "Little India" there.

Education

School districts 

Hicksville is primarily located within the boundaries of the Hicksville Union Free School District. However, a small part of the hamlet's southeastern corner is located within the boundaries of the Bethpage Union Free School District while a small portion of the hamlet's northeastern corner is located within the boundaries of the Syosset Central School District. As such, children who reside within Hicksville and attend public schools go to school in one of these three districts depending on where they live within the hamlet.

Library districts 
Hicksville is located within the boundaries of (and is thus served by) the Hicksville Library District, the Bethpage Library District, and the Syosset Library District. The boundaries of these three districts within the hamlet roughly correspond to those of the three school districts.

Transportation

Road 
Four state-owned roads pass through the hamlet: New York State Route 106, New York State Route 107, the Northern State Parkway, and the Wantagh State Parkway. Additionally, the Northern State Parkway forms portions of the hamlet's northern border.

Other major roads within the hamlet include Jerusalem Avenue, Old Country Road, Plainview Road, and South Oyster Bay Road.

Rail 

Hicksville is a major hub on the Long Island Rail Road, where the Ronkonkoma Branch meets with the Port Jefferson Branch to form the Main Line.

Bus 
The area is also a hub for the following routes operated by Nassau Inter-County Express:
 n20H: Great Neck – Hicksville via Northern Blvd
 n22/n22X: Hicksville – Jamaica via Prospect Avenue/Hillside Avenue
 n24: Hicksville – Jamaica via Old Country Road/Jericho Turnpike
 n48: Hicksville – Hempstead via Carman Road
 n49: Hicksville – Hempstead via Newbridge Road
 n78: Hicksville – Plainview via Old Country Road
 n79: Hicksville – Huntington, New York Walt Whitman Mall and Shops via Old Country Road
 n80: Hicksville – Sunrise Mall via Hicksville Road

Public safety

Hicksville's fire protection is provided by the Hicksville Fire Department. Its police protection comes from the Nassau County Police Department's 2nd and 8th precincts, as well as the MTA Police and Nassau County Auxiliary Police.

Notable people
 Lorraine Bracco, actress; best known for her roles in Goodfellas and The Sopranos 
 Theresa Caputo, medium; star of Long Island Medium 
 Michael Collins, retired soccer player
 Denny Dias, Steely Dan guitarist
 Larry Eisenhauer, professional football player
 Frank Gerwer, professional skateboarder
 Billy Joel, musician
 Maura Johnston, writer and academic 
 Mitch Kupchak, general manager of the Los Angeles Lakers 
 The Lemon Twigs, pop/rock band
 Dennis Michael Lynch, filmmaker
 Jackie Martling, Jackie's Joke Hunt on Howard 101 on Sirius XM Radio
 Don Murphy, producer of Transformers, Natural Born Killers 
 Ed O'Neill, Paddle Ball Pro; best known for being Mayor of Hicksville 
 Tim Parker, soccer player, New York Red Bulls 
 Dave Pietramala, Johns Hopkins University men's lacrosse coach
 Al Pitrelli, Megadeth and Trans-Siberian Orchestra guitarist
 Steve Rosenthal, labor and political strategist
 Al Sarrantonio, science fiction author
 Gary D. Schmidt, author
 Robert Shulman, serial killer
 Rob Walker, legislator

See also
 Heitz Place Courthouse

References

External links

 Hicksville Chamber of Commerce

Oyster Bay (town), New York
Census-designated places in New York (state)
Hamlets in New York (state)
Census-designated places in Nassau County, New York
Hamlets in Nassau County, New York